"The Thrill of It All" is a song by English rock band Roxy Music, released as a single only in the US in March 1975, taken from their 1974 album Country Life. The single was backed by the "All I Want Is You" B-side, an instrumental track called "Your Application's Failed", which is the only track to date written by drummer Paul Thompson. The track was re-released on "The Thrill of It All" boxset.

Personnel
Bryan Ferry – vocals, keyboards
John Gustafson – bass
John Wetton – bass on "Your Application's Failed" 
Edwin Jobson – strings, synthesiser, keyboards
Andrew Mackay – oboe, saxophone
Phil Manzanera – guitar
Paul Thompson – drums

References

1974 singles
Roxy Music songs
1974 songs
Songs written by Bryan Ferry
Polydor Records singles
Island Records singles
Atco Records singles
Song recordings produced by John Punter